Juan Antonio Pino Pérez (born 3 July 1965) is a former professional tennis player from Cuba.

Biography
Pino, who comes from Pinar del Río in western Cuba, began playing tennis at the age of 10 and trained in Havana.

A right handed player, Pino holds the record for most matches won for the Cuba Davis Cup team, a total of 34, in a career spanning 12-years from 1987 to 1999.

His 26 ties for Cuba includes World Group participation in 1993, which was Cuba's first ever appearance in the main competition, having qualified through the expulsion of the Yugoslav team due to the Bosnian War. Cuba's debut World Group fixture came against Sweden in Kalmar and Pino was picked to play Stefan Edberg in the first rubber. Pino was beaten comfortably by Edberg and also lost a dead rubber to Nicklas Kulti, as Sweden won all matches in the tie. The Cubans then travelled to Saint Petersburg for a relegation play-off against Russia, in which they were again soundly defeated by the more experienced team. Pino lost his two singles matches, to Andrei Cherkasov and Yevgeny Kafelnikov.

In addition to his Davis Cup career, Pino also represented Cuba regularly at the Pan American Games. He won five medals at three separate games, three of which came at the 1991 Pan American Games in the Cuban capital.

During his professional career he made the main draw of four Grand Prix/ATP tour tournaments, all as a doubles player. He twice reached singles finals on the Challenger tour, the first in 1989 where he was runner-up to Daniel Orsanic in Goiania and the other a loss to Roberto Jabali at Bogota in 1996, during which he had an opening round win over Franco Squillari. His one Challenger title came in doubles, the Viña del Mar tournament in 1991, with regular doubles partner Mario Tabares.

Challenger titles

Doubles: (1)

References

External links
 
 
 

1965 births
Living people
Cuban male tennis players
Pan American Games bronze medalists for Cuba
Pan American Games medalists in tennis
Tennis players at the 1987 Pan American Games
Tennis players at the 1991 Pan American Games
Tennis players at the 1995 Pan American Games
People from Pinar del Río
Central American and Caribbean Games medalists in tennis
Central American and Caribbean Games gold medalists for Cuba
Central American and Caribbean Games silver medalists for Cuba
Central American and Caribbean Games bronze medalists for Cuba
Medalists at the 1991 Pan American Games
Medalists at the 1995 Pan American Games
20th-century Cuban people
21st-century Cuban people